Geophilus gavoyi is a species of soil centipede in the family Geophilidae. It is closely related to both Geophilus aetnensis and its junior synonym G. evisensis; it's considered by some to be a synonym of G. evisensis. It's found under stones in northern Asia and western Europe, especially France and England. It grows to between 23-35 millimeters in length and has between 39–43 leg pairs in males and 41–45 in females. In the since debunked elongata subspecies it was said to vary from between 49-55 leg pairs in males and between 51-57 in females. As described in 1964, it has well-developed sternal grooves, longer legs than G. aetnensis, and normal claws in the anal legs.

References

gavoyi
Animals described in 1910